The 98th Territorial Defence Battalion 'Azov-Dnipro' is a Ukrainian battalion of the Territorial Defence Forces, a branch of the larger Azov Regiment of the National Guard. The Battalion is led by Rodion Kudryashov, the commander of Azov's reconnaissance and sabotage company. The Battalion is based in the city of Dnipro.

2022 Russian invasion of Ukraine

During the Russian invasion of Ukraine, the battalion was stationed in the town of Orikhiv, Zaporizhzhia Oblast, as part of the Southern Ukraine offensive. On 13 May 2022, the battalion released footage of an attack on a Russian military post near Orikhiv, showing footage of a destroyed Russian ammunition depot.

References 

Military units and formations of Ukraine
Military units and formations of the 2022 Russian invasion of Ukraine